Helianthus carnosus is a rare North American species of sunflower known by the common name lakeside sunflower. It is found only in the northeastern part of the state of Florida in the United States.

Helianthus carnosus is a perennial herb up to 60 cm (2 feet) tall. Most of the leaves are close to the base of the stem, each leaf hairless, evergreen, up to 25 cm (10 inches) long. There are only a few small leaves on the stem, the only species in Florida with that characteristic. One plant usually produces only one flower head, rarely 2 or 3. Each head has with 12-17 yellow ray florets surrounding 100 or more yellow disc florets. The plant grows in wet sites in prairies in coastal beach sands at low elevations.

References

External links
Native Florida Wildflowers: photos of Helianthus carnosus

carnosus
Endemic flora of Florida
Plants described in 1902
Taxa named by John Kunkel Small
Flora without expected TNC conservation status